Celastrina humulus, the hops azure, is a species of blue in the family Lycaenidae. It is found in North America.
The main host plant is wild hops. They can change their body temperature by behaviors like basking or sitting in shade.

The MONA or Hodges number for Celastrina humulus is 4363.3.

References

Further reading

 

Celastrina
Butterflies described in 1998